The Southside School (also known as the Southside Elementary School) is a historic school in Brickell in Downtown Miami, Florida. It is located at 45 Southwest 13th Street. On January 4, 1989, it was added to the U.S. National Register of Historic Places.

Southside is the oldest elementary school in Miami-Dade county. It partners with Miami Science Museum and Lowe Art Museum. One famous alumna is Ileana Ros-Lehtinen. Southside School is served by the Miami Metrorail at the Brickell Station and by the Metromover.

References

External links
 Southside Elementary School website
 Dade County listings at National Register of Historic Places
 Florida's Office of Cultural and Historical Programs
 Dade County listings
 Southside Elementary Bilingual School

Buildings and structures in Miami
Public elementary schools in Florida
National Register of Historic Places in Miami
Miami-Dade County Public Schools